Avra by Greek Cypriot singer Ivi Adamou, is the Greek version of the song "Mestral" by the Greek producer Pink Noisy.

Production and recording
Ivi's vocals on "Avra" were recorded and produced by Pink Noisy. "Avra" was co-produced and co-arranged by the Greek producer Pink Noisy (George Kartsakis) and co-written by the Greeks GiorGio Sopidis, Faidon Samsidis.

Formats and track listings
iTunes EP
"Avra (Mestral)" - 3:45

References

2012 singles
Ivi Adamou songs
Eurodance songs
2012 songs
Sony Music singles
Greek-language songs